The Last Chance Range is a mountain range in Nye County, Nevada. It lies immediately north of Pahrump, Nevada, and west of Nevada State Route 160.

References 

Mountain ranges of Nevada
Amargosa Desert
Mountain ranges of Nye County, Nevada
Mountain ranges of the Mojave Desert
Mountain ranges of the Great Basin